Miss Universe Mongolia 2019 is the 2nd edition of the Miss Universe Mongolia pageant that was held on September 20, 2019. Miss Universe Mongolia 2018 Dolgion Delgarjav crowned Gunzaya Bat-Erdene as her successor at the end of the event.

Gunzaya represented Mongolia at the Miss Universe 2019 beauty pageant on December 8, 2019 at Atlanta, Georgia, United States but failed to penetrate a spot in the Top 20.

References

2019 beauty pageants
Beauty pageants in Mongolia